New Harbour is a bay about  wide between Cape Bernacchi and Butter Point along the coast of Victoria Land, due west of Ross Island. It was discovered by the British National Antarctic Expedition (1901–04) and so named because this new harbor was found while the Discovery was seeking the farthest possible southern anchorage along the coast of Victoria Land. The Ferrar Glacier flows into the bay, which overlooked by Mount Barnes, which sits at the eastern end of the Kukri Hills range.

Wales Stream carries water from Wales Glacier into Explorers Cove, which indents the harbor at its northwest head. Explorers Cove was named in 1976 by the Advisory Committee on Antarctic Names (US-ACAN) in recognition of the large number of explorers that have worked in the vicinity of this cove. Quinn Gully, an ice-free gully at the lower end of Taylor Valley, descends to the seashore here. On the north side of the entrance is McClintock Point, named by US-ACAN in 1997 for James B. McClintock, who studied the benthos of McMurdo Sound west of Ross Island and along the coast from Granite Harbour to Cape Chocolate. Baker Point is a headland at the south side of the cove's entrance. It was named by US-ACAN after Bill James Baker, who has conducted underwater research in several areas of McMurdo Sound.

See also 
Thoreson Peak

References 

Bays of Victoria Land
Scott Coast
Ports and harbours of the Ross Dependency